Sunny Singh Nijjar (born 6 October 1988)  is an Indian actor and model who works in Hindi films. He made his film debut with a brief role in Dil Toh Baccha Hai Ji (2011), followed by a role in Akaash Vani (2013). His first commercial success was the buddy film Pyaar Ka Punchnama 2 (2015), and his highest-grossing release came in 2018 with the romantic comedy Sonu Ke Titu Ki Sweety.

Early life 
Singh was born to stunt director Jai Singh Nijjar, who has been a stunt director for numerous films such as Chennai Express (2013) and Shivaay (2016).

Career 

Singh made his television debut in 2007 through the Star Plus-popular running series Kasautii Zindagii Kay, where he played the love interest of the character played by Kratika Sengar. Later, he played Karan in the 2009 series Shakuntala.

Singh began his film career in 2011 with Madhur Bhandarkar's comedy Dil Toh Baccha Hai Ji, where he made a cameo appearance in the concluding scene alongside Emraan Hashmi and newcomer Chetna Pande. The film was a modest success. His first starring role was as an abusive husband, Ravi, alongside Kartik Aaryan and Nushrat Bharucha in Luv Ranjan's romantic drama Akaash Vani, which was a commercial failure.

Singh reteamed with Aaryan, Ranjan and Bharucha for Pyaar Ka Punchnama 2, a sequel to the 2011 film Pyaar Ka Punchnama and co-starring Aaryan, Bharucha, Omkar Kapoor, Ishita Raj Sharma and Sonnalli Seygall. His highest-grossing release came in 2018 when he teamed up with the trio for the third time in Sonu Ke Titu Ki Sweety.

Singh had a cameo appearance in Akiv Ali's directorial debut, De De Pyaar De, a romantic comedy film produced by Ranjan, about a 50-year-old businessman who falls in love with a 26-year-old girl, and starring Ajay Devgn opposite Rakul Preet Singh and Tabu. He also starred in Smeep Kang's comedy film Jhootha Kahin Ka alongside Kapoor and Jimmy Sheirgill.

Singh's first release as a lead actor was Pyaar Ka Punchnama 2 producer Abhishek Pathak's directorial debut Ujda Chaman, which was based on the concept of baldness. His performance was appreciated but the film only become a moderate success at the box-office.

Singh's latest release was Jai Mummy Di, a romantic comedy starring Seygall, Supriya Pathak, and Poonam Dhillon. The film, written and directed by Navjot Gulati and produced again by Ranjan, was released on 17 January 2020 to poor response.

In February 2021, it was announced that he will play Lakshmana in Adipurush, an upcoming film based on Ramayana.

Filmography

Films

Television

Music videos

References

External links 
 

Indian male film actors
Indian male television actors
Living people
Male actors in Hindi cinema
Male actors in Hindi television
21st-century Indian male actors
Male actors from Mumbai
1985 births